The Roman Catholic Diocese of Namibe is a Latin diocese in the Angolan Namibe Province.

It is a suffragan in the Ecclesiastical province of the Metropolitan Archdiocese of Lubango.

Special churches 
The cathedral episcopal see of the diocese is Sé Catedral de São Pedro (Cathedral of St. Peter, dedicated to the diocese's patron saint), in the Angolan city of Moçâmedes, capital of the Namibe province.

History 
 Established on 21 March 2009 as Diocese of Namibe, on territory split off from the Roman Catholic Archdiocese of Lubango, to which it is suffragan.

Episcopal incumbents 
(all Roman rite)

 Bishop Mateus Feliciano Tomás (21 March 2009 – 30 October 2010, died)
 Bishop Dionisio Hisiilenapo (8 July 2011 – ...)

See also 

 Roman Catholicism in Angola

Source - External link 
 GCatholic.org, with incumbent biography links

Roman Catholic dioceses in Angola
Christian organizations established in 2009
Roman Catholic dioceses and prelatures established in the 21st century
Namibe, Roman Catholic Diocese of